Stanfieldia is a genus of flowering plants in the daisy family.  The single species, Stanfieldia nealleyi, was based on Haplopappus nealleyi J.M. Coulter.  Existing compilations consider the application of these names to be unresolved, but annotations on the type specimen of Haplopappus nealleyi in the US National Herbarium suggest that they may be synonyms of Clappia suaedifolia.

References

Monotypic Asteraceae genera
Tageteae